Livingston Middlemost (1 April 1839 – 28 October 1897) was an English first-class cricketer.

Middlemost was born at Westoe, South Shields. He made his debut in first-class cricket for the North against Surrey at Salford in 1860. Batting once in the match, Middlemost was dismissed for 4 runs in the North's first-innings by H. H. Stephenson. He made a second first-class appearance seventeen years later for the Players of the North against the Gentlemen of the North at Huddersfield. Batting twice in the match, he was dismissed for a duck batting at number eleven in the Player's first-innings by William Mycroft, while in their second-innings he opened the batting, scoring 17 runs before retiring out.

By profession, he was a woollen manufacturer and merchant. A year prior to his death he had travelled to Australia for health reasons. He died suddenly on 28 October 1897 at Huddersfield, having returned from playing golf at Fixby.

References

External links

1839 births
1897 deaths
Cricketers from South Shields
English cricketers
North v South cricketers
Players of the North cricketers